Kudyny  is an abandoned village in the administrative district of Gmina Pasłęk, within Elbląg County, Warmian-Masurian Voivodeship, in northern Poland.

Today, almost nothing is left from the village. There are only fields, plants, and the old road.

References

Kudyny

Abandoned places in Poland